I Polykatoikia (The Block of Flats), is a popular Greek Comedy television series, originally broadcast on Mega Channel and lasting for three seasons, from October 6, 2008 until May 27, 2011.
It consists of 132 episodes. The script of each of the first 90 episodes was taken from the Spanish series Aquí no hay quien viva. The 2019-2020 season will produce  a new series called "Tha Ginei tis Polykatoikias".

Plot 
This is a story of a "typical" apartment building at 19 Alamanas Street in downtown Athens. Thanasis Balafoutis (Pavlos Chaikalis) is the apartment manager and he's working hard to support his wife Margarita, his son Petros and his daughter Natali. Konstantinos, Natali's boyfriend, is a resourceful person who is currently unemployed and he doing Janitor services. Natali is also unemployed and kind of lazy.

Loukia works in a magazine as the manager of her boyfriend Takis but they keep their relationship as a secret at work. Tzovani is an immigrant from Albania with a wealthy job. He is married with Tzouli, ex Miss Albania and they have a daughter Romina who managed to pass the exams in medicine school. Markos and Hristos are a gay couple and Vasiliki(who also is still a virgin),Panagiota and Mary are the oldest tenants who are still looking to find their partners.

Eleni is lyrics writer with a low income. She is insecure and she believes that she has bad luck, especially with guys. Everyone will go through difficult situations which are transferred to the public with hilarious manner. Surface nobody likes anyone but when they are in trouble conspire together for one purpose: "the good of the apartment building."

Cast
Main Characters

Cameo Characters

External links 
MegaTV Polikatikia website
List of programs broadcast by Mega Channel

Mega Channel original programming
Greek LGBT-related television shows
2008 Greek television series debuts
2011 Greek television series endings
2000s Greek television series
2010s Greek television series
Greek-language television shows